Bachana Tskhadadze (born 23 October 1987) is a Georgian former footballer who played as a striker. Currently working as a certified senior football manager.

Club career

Inter Baku
Tskhadadze signed for Inter Baku in May 2010, where he spent 5 seasons and managed to score 47 goals which is the club's all-time record until present.

Flamurtari Vlorë

On 10 August 2015, Tskhadadze signed a one-year deal with Albanian Superliga side Flamurtari Vlorë with an option to extend for another year. He was presented to the media in the very same day, and was given number 28 for the upcoming 2015–16 season.

Bastia
Tskhadadze joined Corsican club Bastia in the summer of 2018 just a year from recovery of an achilles tendon surgery. He announced his retirement in January 2019 because of the multiple injuries he was suffering.

International career
He debuted for Georgia's national team in a friendly match against Liechtenstein on 5 March 2014.

Career statistics

Club

International

Honours

Club
Ameri Tbilisi

Georgian Super Cup (1): 2007

Inter Baku

Commonwealth of Independent States Cup (1): 2011

FC Samtredia

Erovnuli Liga (1) 2016

FC Chikhura Sachkhere

Georgian Cup (1) 2017

Senior football manager
After retiring from professional football as a player, Bachana Tskhadadze founded an international sports agency; Football Business Consulting, where he was the CEO from 2019 to 2022.

In February 2022, Tskhadadze was appointed as the sports director of FC RUSTAVI and from April 2022 until present he is the General director of FC RUSTAVI.

Personal life
Bachana Tskhadadze is the son of former Georgian international Football player and current  Football coach Kakhaber Tskhadadze.

References

External links
 

1987 births
Living people
Footballers from Georgia (country)
Georgia (country) international footballers
Association football forwards
FC Sioni Bolnisi players
FC WIT Georgia players
FC Ameri Tbilisi players
FK Standard Sumgayit players
FC Gagra players
FC Spartaki Tskhinvali players
Shamakhi FK players
Simurq PIK players
Flamurtari Vlorë players
FC Lokomotivi Tbilisi players
FC Samtredia players
FC Chikhura Sachkhere players
SC Bastia players
Kategoria Superiore players
Expatriate footballers from Georgia (country)
Expatriate footballers in Azerbaijan
Expatriate sportspeople from Georgia (country) in Azerbaijan
Expatriate footballers in Albania
Expatriate sportspeople from Georgia (country) in Albania
Expatriate footballers in France
Expatriate sportspeople from Georgia (country) in France
Footballers from Tbilisi
Erovnuli Liga players